Penno is a surname or, more rarely, a given name that may refer to:

Surname
Enno Penno (1930–2016), Estonian politician
Gino Penno (1920–1998), Italian tenor
Rudolf Penno (1896–1951), Estonian politician
William A. Penno, Jr. (1843–1929), American banjo player, composer, music teacher

Surnames